Angelo Pellegrini (1904 – 1991) was an American writer and professor of English Literature at the University of Washington. His books are about the pleasures of growing and making your own food and wine, and about the Italian immigrant experience.

Pellegrini's family immigrated in 1913 from Tuscany to McCleary, Washington, where his father worked for a sawmill.  His first book was titled Argumentation and Public Discussion, written in 1936 with Brents Stirling. In 1948, he wrote The Unprejudiced Palate, an important work in the history of food literature that remains in print.

In 1946, Sunset published Pellegrini's recipe for pesto, likely the first major publication of a pesto recipe in the United States. Two years earlier The New York Times had first mentioned the sauce, referring to an imported canned pesto paste. The sauce was not immediately embraced by the American public and did not rise in popularity until the 1980s and 1990s.

Books 
The Unprejudiced Palate (1948)
Immigrant's Return (1951)
Americans By Choice (1956)
Wine and the Good Life (1965)
Washington:  Profile of a State (1967)
The Food Lover's Garden (1970)
Lean Years, Happy Years (1983)
American Dream:  An Immigrant's Quest (1986)
Argumentation and Public Discussion (with Brents Sterling) 1936
Vintage Pellegrini: the collected wisdom of an American Buongustaio-1990

References 

Italian food writers
1904 births
1991 deaths
Italian emigrants to the United States
University of Washington faculty
People from Grays Harbor County, Washington